The Global Financial Centres Index (GFCI)  is a ranking of the competitiveness of financial centres based on over 29,000 financial centre assessments from an online questionnaire together with over 100 indices from organisations such as the World Bank, the Organisation for Economic Co-operation and Development (OECD), and the Economist Intelligence Unit. The first index was published in March 2007. It has been jointly published twice per year by Z/Yen Group in London and the China Development Institute in Shenzhen since 2015, and is widely quoted as a top source for ranking financial centres.

GFCI32 (2022)
The thirty-first edition of the Global Financial Centres Index (GFCI 31) was published on 22 September 2022. GFCI 32 provides evaluations of future competitiveness and rankings for 119 financial centres around the world. Rankings are based on surveys and 150 factors, with quantitative measures from the World Bank, The Economist Intelligence Unit, the OECD and United Nations. The 2022 report ranks New York at the top position followed by London and Singapore. Only the top 20 are shown in the following table:

Financial centre profiles 
This report ranked 116 international financial centers into the following matrix, as of 24 September 2021:

Top 15 centres by area of competitiveness 

This is run for five separate areas of competitiveness to assess how financial centres perform in each of the areas GFCI 25 (2021 March).

Top 15 centres by industry sector 

This creates separate sub-indices: banking, investment management, insurance, professional services, and government and regulatory sectors for GFCI 25 (2019 March) .

Key areas 
The human capital factors summarize the availability of a skilled workforce, the flexibility of the labour market, the quality of the business education and the skill-set of the workforce, and quality of life. 

The business environment factors aggregate and value the regulation, tax rates, levels of corruption, economic freedom and how difficult in general it is to do business. To measure regulation an online questionnaire has been used. 

The financial sector development factors assess the volume and value of trading in capital markets and other financial markets, the cluster effect of the number of different financial service companies at the location, and employment and economic output indicators. 

The infrastructure factors account for the price and availability of office space at the location, as well as public transport. 

Reputation and general considers more subjective aspects such as innovation, brand appeal, cultural diversity and competitive positioning.

Industry sectors 
The index provides sub-rankings in the main areas of financial services – banking, investment management, insurance, professional services, government and regulation.

References

Financial markets
Lists of cities
Finance lists

External links